For the similarly-titled Dolly Parton song, see All I Can Do

"It's All I Can Do" is a song written by Richard Leigh and Archie Jordan, and recorded by Canadian country music artist Anne Murray.  It was released in September 1981 as the third single from her album Where Do You Go When You Dream.  The song reached No. 1 on the RPM Country Tracks chart in Canada and #9 on the Billboard Hot Country Singles chart in the United States. The song was also recorded by American country music artist Ronnie Milsap for his 1981 album There's No Gettin' Over Me.

Charts

References

1981 singles
1981 songs
Anne Murray songs
Ronnie Milsap songs
Songs written by Richard Leigh (songwriter)
Song recordings produced by Jim Ed Norman
Capitol Records singles
Songs written by Archie Jordan